Randy Dedini (born January 7, 1970) is a retired American soccer goalkeeper who played professionally in the USL A-League.  He is the head coach of the Sacramento State women's soccer team.

Player

Youth
In 1988, Dedini graduated from Vacaville High School.  He began his collegiate career at American River College for two years before transferring to Sonoma State.  He played at Sonoma in 1992 and 1993, being named a 1993 Division II Second Team All American.   Dedini graduated with a bachelor's degree in kinesiology and was inducted into the school's Athletic Hall of Fame in 2008.

Professional
In 1994, Dedini turned professional with the North Bay Breakers of the USISL.  In 1995, Dedini moved to the Chico Rooks.  The San Jose Clash signed Dedini during the 1996 pre-season but released him before the first game of the season.  He returned to the Rooks where he was 1996 All League. In 1997, Dedini joined the Nashville Metros where he played through the 1998 season.  In 1998, the Los Angeles Galaxy called Dedini up as a backup.  In 1999, Dedini signed with the Pittsburgh Riverhounds where he remained until his retirement in 2003.  Over his five years in Pittsburgh, Dedini was called up several times by Major League Soccer teams, but never entered a game. In July 1999, the Colorado Rapids called Dedini up for two games.   He also spent time that season with the Kansas City Wizards.  On June 30, 2000, the Rapids brought Dedini up for one game.  In 2001, he spent time with the New England Revolution and the Dallas Burn.

Coach
From 1997 to 2002, Dedini served as an assistant coach with the Quaker Valley High School boys' soccer team.  In 2004, he became an assistant (goalkeeper) coach with Sacramento State women's soccer team.  In 2005, he became a full assistant.  On February 2, 2007, Dedini replaced Katie Poynter as head coach.  He was the 2007 and 2010 Big Sky Conference Coach of the Year.

References

External links
 

Living people
1970 births
American soccer coaches
American soccer players
Chico Rooks players
Colorado Rapids players
FC Dallas players
LA Galaxy players
Nashville Metros players
New England Revolution players
North Bay Breakers players
Pittsburgh Riverhounds SC players
Sporting Kansas City players
USISL players
A-League (1995–2004) players
People from Vacaville, California
Soccer players from California
Association football goalkeepers
American River Beavers men's soccer players
Sonoma State Seawolves men's soccer players
Sacramento State Hornets